The Cost of Loving is the third studio album by English band The Style Council. It was originally released in February 1987. The album was recorded over a period of three months in 1986, at Solid Bond Studios (owned by their lead vocalist, Paul Weller). The album is generally regarded as the culmination of the smoother, more adult-oriented sound of the band's later work. The album peaked at number 2 in the UK charts, and achieved gold status from the BPI. It featured the singles "It Didn't Matter" and "Waiting", which had corresponding music videos. "It Didn't Matter" reached the top 10 in the UK charts, however "Waiting" failed to make the top 40, which was a first for any Style Council single.

On release, The Cost of Loving received mixed reviews from music journalists. Today, the album is generally seen as a turning point in the band's career, leading to the sounds later explored on Confessions of a Pop Group and Modernism: A New Decade, whilst also signalling the start of the band's declining commercial and critical success. The band themselves have been quite vocal in being less satisfied with the album.

Production and recording
This album saw the group concentrating on the R&B styles that had been growing in America during the eighties. The album included a cover of "Angel," a song originally recorded by Anita Baker. Its urban contemporary feel was a jolt to listeners who had grown accustomed to the continental mix of soul music, jazz, and European folk styles that the band had displayed on their previous two albums. United States label Geffen Records heard the tracks and promptly dropped The Style Council from their roster. Socially conscious soul music pioneer Curtis Mayfield was asked to mix some of the material on the album, which displays hints of being influenced by house music and the Jimmy Jam and Terry Lewis sound. Tracks from the album were included in a 37-minute film, Jerusalem, about the band.

Cover art
The initial British pressings of the album were conceived and issued as two 12" EPs in a gatefold sleeve (designed by Simon Halfon with ideas from Paul Weller). Polygram records would eventually issue the album Stateside without its much-maligned International Orange jacket design. When asked by Uncut magazine whether the album cover was intended as "a citric version of The Beatles' White Album?", Weller replied that "the only thing" he "can say in its defence is that it's in some book as one of the top 100 album sleeves."

Critical reception

In a retrospective review for AllMusic, critic Stephen Thomas Erlewine wrote, "Filled with bland, professional soul-pop, few of the songs have memorable melodies and the band tends to meander through the slick arrangements." He further noted that "Weller's lyrics were self-important and under-developed, with only the hit single 'It Didn't Matter' making a lasting impression among the undistinguished songs that comprised the majority of the album."

In 1991, the NME included the album in a list of fourteen albums that "should've been an EP".

Track listing

Personnel

 Paul Weller – lead and background vocals; guitars; synthesizers; drum programming
 Mick Talbot – acoustic and electric pianos, Wurlitzer and Hammond organs; synthesizers; bass synthesizer
 Dee C. Lee – lead and background vocals
 Steve White – drums; percussion
 The Dynamic Three – rapping on "Right to Go"
 Steve Sidelynk – percussion on "Right to Go", congas on "Heavens Above" and "Fairy Tales"
 Camelle Hinds – bass guitar on "Heavens Above", "Angel" and "Walking the Night"
 Billy Chapman – saxophone on "Heavens Above"
 Anne Stephenson – violin on "Heavens Above"
 Guy Barker – trumpet on "Fairy Tales"; flugelhorn on "Walking the Night"
 Roddy Lorimer – trumpet on "Fairy Tales"; flugelhorn on "Walking the Night"
 Luke Tunney – trumpet on "Fairy Tales"; flugelhorn on "Walking the Night"
 Ashley Slater – trombone on "Fairy Tales"
 Chris Lawrence – trombone on "Fairy Tales"
 Pete Thams – trombone on "Fairy Tales"
 John Valentine – backing vocals on "Walking the Night"
 John Mealing – orchestral arrangements
 Jezar – engineer, sequencing, mixer on "Right to Go"
 Alan Leeming – engineer, mixer on "The Cost Of Loving"
 Paul Weller – producer
 The Valentine Brothers – mixers on "It Didn't Matter" and "Angel"
 Matthew Kasha – mixer on "Heavens Above"
 Curtis Mayfield – mixer on "Fairy Tales"
 Carl Beatty – mixer on "Walking the Night"
 John Valentine – mixer on "Waiting"

Charts

Certifications

See also
 List of albums released in 1987

References
Citations

External links
 

1987 albums
The Style Council albums
Polydor Records albums